The Nuclear power station Paluel lies within the French town Paluel in  Normandy in the Département Seine-Maritime.  The nuclear power station, which consists of four 1330 MWe class pressurized water reactors, is about 40 kilometers far away from the city of Dieppe and employs approx. 1,250 full-time workers.  The operator is the French company EDF.  Water from the English Channel is used for cooling.

Achievement

The installed total output of 5.528 GW makes it one of the largest nuclear power stations in France.  By electrical output it is second place in France and seventh place worldwide.  It feeds on average 32 billion kilowatt-hours into the public electricity grid every year.

Safety

In the past, there were problems with the cooling of the plant due to blockage of cooling water from the English Channel, which caused an automatic reactor trip.
The blockage was caused in part by seasonally-present macroalgae, and EDF is pursuing possible solutions to prevent its recurrence with Gunderboom, Inc.

In April 2016 a 450 tonne steam generator crashed onto the reactor floor during the decennial maintenance outage of Paluel 2. Paluel 2 went offline in May 2015, and the incident delayed it's restart until July 2018 after replacement of the steam generator and full testing of concrete damages.

Reactors

Notes

References

Nuclear power stations in France
Buildings and structures in Seine-Maritime